Zalaqi-ye Sharqi Rural District is a rural district (dehestan) in Besharat District, Aligudarz County, Lorestan Province, Iran. At the 2006 census, its population was 3,267, in 552 families.  The rural district has 45 villages.

References 

Rural Districts of Lorestan Province
Aligudarz County